Tyler County Courthouse may refer to:

Tyler County Courthouse (Texas)
Tyler County Courthouse and Jail,  Middlebourne, West Virginia